Echinochloa is a very widespread  genus of plants in the grass family and tribe  Paniceae. Some of the species are known by the common names barnyard grass or cockspur grass.

Some of the species within this genus are millets that are grown as cereal or fodder crops. The most notable of these are Japanese millet (E. esculenta) in East Asia, Indian barnyard millet (E. frumentacea) in South Asia, and burgu millet (E. stagnina) in West Africa. Collectively, the members of this genus are called barnyard grasses (though this may also refer to E. crus-galli specifically), and are also known as barnyard millets or billion-dollar grasses.

When not grown on purpose, these grasses may become a nuisance to farmers. In particular, common barnyard grass (E. crus-galli) is notorious as a weed. It is not easily suppressed with living mulches such as velvet bean (Mucuna pruriens var. utilis). Early barnyard grass (E. oryzoides) is a well-known example of Vavilovian mimicry: the plants have evolved to resemble rice (Oryza), enabling them to escape weeding more easily.

Among the plant pathogens that affect this genus are the sac fungus Cochliobolus sativus, which has been noted on common barnyard grass, and rice hoja blanca virus. Both affect many other grass species, in particular most important cereals, and Echinochloa weeds may serve as a reservoir. The fungi Drechslera monoceras and Exserohilum monoceras have been evaluated with some success as potential biocontrol agents of common barnyard grass in rice fields. More research is necessary, however, because they may not be host-specific enough to be of practical use. Insect pests include Atherigona falcata, the barnyard millet shoot fly.

Species
 Species

 Formerly included
see Acroceras Axonopus Brachiaria Oplismenopsis Oplismenus Panicum Paspalidium Pseudechinolaena Setaria Urochloa

References

External links

 Plants for a Future: E. crus-galli.
 Lost Crops of Africa: Volume 1: Grains, Chapter 14: Wild Grains.
 Alternative Field Crops Manual: Millets.

 
Millets
Grasses of Asia
Grasses of North America
Grasses of South America
Poaceae genera
Taxa named by Palisot de Beauvois